Lupin Limited is an Indian multinational pharmaceutical company based in Mumbai. It is one of the largest generic pharmaceutical companies by revenue globally. The company's key focus areas include paediatrics, cardiovascular, anti-infectives, diabetology, asthma and anti-tuberculosis.

History and evolution
Lupin was founded in 1968 by Desh Bandhu Gupta, who was a professor of chemistry at BITS-Pilani, Rajasthan. Gupta moved to Mumbai in the 60s to work on his business enterprise for which initially he had borrowed Rs 5000 from his wife to fund his venture. Subsequent funding from Central Bank of India, the company was able to start their manufacturing facility for producing folic acid and iron tablets for Government of India mother and child health program. Later Lupin started manufacturing anti TB drugs which at one point formed 36% of the company sales and was considered as the largest TB drugs manufacturer in the world.

After success with Lupin, in 1988 Gupta founded the group's CSR arm, the Lupin Human Welfare & Research Foundation (LHWRF). This initiative was dedicated to sustainable rural development with the aim to uplift families living below the poverty line.

In July 2015 the company announced its intention to acquire Gavis Pharmaceuticals and Novel Laboratories for $880 million.

The founder, Desh Bandhu Gupta died in June 2017 and was subsequently replaced as chairman by his wife, Manju Deshbandhu Gupta.

In October 2019, Lupin announced the Appointment of Sreeji Gopinatham as Chief Information Officer (CIO).

In March 2019, the US FDA put several Lupin drug plants on notice for quality problems, and indicated it might not approve future Lupin drug applications.

Research and development
Lupin's research program covers the entire pharma product chain. The company's R&D program is headquartered in the Lupin Research Park located near Pune and Aurangabad that houses over 1,400 scientists. Lupin's R&D covers:
 Generics Research
 Process Research
 Pharmaceutical Research
 Advanced Drug Delivery Systems (ADDS) Research 
 Intellectual Property Management
 Novel Drug Discovery and Development (NDDD)
 Biotechnology Research

Businesses
Lupin's businesses encompass the entire pharmaceutical value chain, ranging from branded and generic formulations, APIs, advanced drug delivery systems to biotechnology. The company's drugs reach  70 countries with a footprint that covers advanced markets such as USA, Europe, Japan, Australia as well  as emerging markets including India, the Philippines and South Africa to name a few.

Key markets

United States 
Headquartered in Baltimore, Maryland, Lupin Pharmaceuticals Inc. (LPI), the company's US subsidiary is a $891 million enterprise. It has a presence in the branded and generics markets of the US. In the branded business, Lupin operates in the CVS and Pediatric segments. The company is the market leader in 28 products out of the 77 products marketed in the US generics market, of which it is amongst the Top 3 by market share in 57 of these products (IMS Health, December 2014):   Suprax (Cefixime), a paediatric antibiotic, is Lupin's top-selling product here. Other products in Lupin's branded portfolio include  Antara<  (Fenofibrate), Locoid lotion, Alinia  (Nitazoxanide) and   InspiraChambers (Anti-static valved holding chamber). The company is also the 5th largest and fastest growing generics player in the US (5.3% market share by prescriptions, IMS Health). Lupin's US brands business contributed 9% of total US sales whereas the generics business contributed 91% during FY 2014–15.

India Region Formulations (IRF) 
Lupin's IRF business focuses on Lifestyle diseases and Chronic disease therapy segments, particularly in  Cardiology, Central Nervous System (CNS), Diabetology, Anti-Asthma, Anti-Infective, Gastro Intestinal and Oncology.

It has 12 manufacturing plants and 2 Research plants in India, as Jammu(J&K), Mandideep & Indore (Madhya pradesh), Ankaleswar & Dabasa (Gujarat), Tarapur, Aurangabad and Nagpur (Maharashtra), Goa, Visakhapatnam (Andhra Pradesh) and Sikkim; where research centre at Pune and Aurangabad.
Among these the baby plant is Nagpur plant which will the biggest formulation unit for Lupin in coming year.

Europe 
Lupin's focus in the European Union encompasses Anti-Infectives, Cardiovascular, and CNS therapy areas, along with niche opportunities in segments like Oral Contraceptives, Dermatology and Ophthalmics. The company's presence in France is by way of a trade partnership; in Germany, it operates through its acquired entity  Hormosan Pharma GmbH. ] (Hormosan); while the UK business is a direct-to-market initiative.

Japan 
Lupin is the fastest-growing Top 10 generic pharmaceuticals player in Japan (IMS) . It operates in Japan through its subsidiary,   Kyowa Pharmaceutical Industry Co. Ltd. (Kyowa), a company   acquired in 2007, and  I’rom, Pharmaceutical Co. Ltd  (IP), acquired in 2011. Kyowa has an active presence in Neurology, Cardiovascular, Gastroenterology and the Respiratory therapy segments. I'rom is a niche injectables company.

In 2014, Lupin entered into a strategic joint venture agreement with Toyama-based Japanese pharmaceuticals company, Yoshindo Inc. to create   YL Biologics (YLB). YLB will be jointly managed by both partners and will be responsible for conducting clinical development of certain biosimilars including regulatory fillings and obtaining marketing authorization in Japan.

In 2019, Lupin exited the generic pharmaceuticals business in Japan by divesting its stake in Kyowa to private equity firm Unison for an enterprise value of Japanese 57,361 million yen (Rs 3,702.4 crore).

South Africa 
Lupin's South African subsidiary,  Pharma Dynamics (PD) is the fastest growing and the 4th largest generic company in the South African market (IMS). The company is a market leader in the Cardiovascular segment and has a growing presence in Neurology, Gastroenterology and the Over the Counter (OTC) segments.

Australia 
Lupin entered the Australian market through its subsidiary,  Generic Health Pte. Ltd.  (GH). It subsequently acquired the worldwide marketing rights to the over-100-year-old Australian brand Goanna, used for pain management.

Philippines 
Lupin's Philippines subsidiary   Multicare Pharmaceuticals  (Multicare), is a branded generic company focused on Women's Health, Pediatrics, Gastro-Intestinal and Diabetes care. FY 2012 also marked its foray into the Neurology segment when it entered into a strategic marketing partnership with Sanofi.

Mexico & Latin America 
In 2014, Lupin acquired 100% equity stake in  Laboratories Grin, S.A. De C.V. (Grin), Mexico, a specialty pharmaceutical company engaged in the development, manufacturing and commercialization of branded ophthalmic products. This marked their entry into Mexico and the larger Latin American pharmaceuticals market. In May 2015, Lupin entered the Brazilian market with its acquisition of 100% stake in  Medquímica Indústria Farmacêutica S.A., Brazil, (Medquímica).

Key businesses

Anti-Tuberculosis 
Lupin is a global leader in Cephalosporins, Cardiovasculars and the anti-TB space.  The company is also a strategic supplier of anti-TB products to the Stop TB Partnership, with its formulations supplied to more than 50 countries through GDF procurement.

Rgwduen is also a global leader in anti-TB APIs, and is associated with the Revised National Tuberculosis Control Program of the Government of India. It   supplies to various Government agencies, the Stop TB Partnership and various other international agencies like Pan American Health Organization (PAHO), Médecins Sans Frontières (MSF) and the Damien Foundation. Ethambutol, Rifampicin and Pyrazinamide are the company's top selling TB molecules.

Biotechnology research 
The Lupin Biotechnology Research Group, based out of Ghotawade & Wakad, near Pune is focussed on developing biosimilars. As of May 2013, it  has a pipeline of 10 biosimilar products under development, and is close to getting marketing authorization for 2 of its oncology products for the Indian market. Lupin has competencies for the complete development and manufacture of recombinant protein therapeutic products from high yielding and proprietary microbial and mammalian cell culture platforms. The Biotech R&D infrastructure offers product development capabilities ranging from clone development, process optimization, analytical method development, bioassay, formulation, stability studies, non-clinical and clinical studies backed by a sound understanding of regulatory and IP aspects. The company's biotech development programs are in compliance of and follow  ICH,  EMEA,  and Indian Regulatory guidelines. Company has developed biosimilar versions of Etanercept, Filgrastim, Peg-filgrastim, Ranibizumab.

Diagnostics 
Lupin forayed into diagnostics business in December 2021 to provide a comprehensive range of diagnostic tests in India which includes molecular diagnostics, cytogenetics, flow cytometry, microbiology and serology among others.

Corporate social responsibility
The Lupin Human Welfare & Research Foundation (LHWRF) was set up in 1988. The project began with a set of rural development projects centred around 35 villages in Bharatpur District, Rajasthan. Later this expanded to other regions and states. The initiative has so far reached out to over 2.8 million people across over 3,400 villages in eight states of India including Rajasthan, Madhya Pradesh, Maharashtra, Uttarakhand, Gujarat and Goa. In July 2018, Lupin foundation signed a statement of Intent with the National Institution for Transforming India (Niti Aayog), a policy think tank of the government of India, to collaborate in the Aspirational Districts Programme and support the development of three backward districts – Nandurbar in Maharashtra, Vidisha in Madhya Pradesh and Dholpur in Rajasthan.

References

External links
 

Manufacturing companies based in Mumbai
Pharmaceutical companies established in 1968
Pharmaceutical companies of India
Indian companies established in 1968
Indian brands
1968 establishments in Maharashtra
Companies listed on the National Stock Exchange of India
Companies listed on the Bombay Stock Exchange